Dmitri Sergeyevich Akimov (born 14 September 1980) is a former Russian former football player.

Career
He last played for FC Dynamo Saint Petersburg. He made his debut in the Russian Premier League in 2000 for FC Zenit St. Petersburg. He was the top scorer in the Russian First Division in 2007, scoring 34 goals. He was also the top scorer in the Russian Second Division, East Zone in 2002 (22 goals) and 2004 (24 goals).

Honours
 Russian Premier League bronze: 2001.
 Russian First Division top scorer: 2007.
 Russian Second Division Zone East best player: 2004.

External links
 
  Profile on the FC Rostov site

1980 births
Living people
Russian footballers
Association football forwards
FC Tyumen players
FC Zenit Saint Petersburg players
FC Rostov players
Russian Premier League players
FC Sibir Novosibirsk players
FC Metallurg Lipetsk players
FC Fakel Voronezh players
Footballers from Saint Petersburg
FC Dynamo Saint Petersburg players
Russian expatriate footballers
Expatriate footballers in Belarus
FC Dinamo Minsk players
FC Zenit-2 Saint Petersburg players